Mohammed Faraj Saeed Al-Rubaie Al-Yami (born 14 August 1997), simply known as Mohammed Al-Rubaie or Mohammed Al-Yami, is a Saudi Arabian footballer who plays as a goalkeeper for Al-Ahli.

Personal life
Mohammed is the brother of Masoud Al-Rubaie and the cousin of Hamad Al-Rabaei, Saeed Al-Rubaie and Abdullah Al-Rubaie.

Club career
On 17 May 2013, Al-Rubaie joined Al-Ahli from Al-Akhdoud. On 2 August 2018, Al-Rubaie joined Al-Batin on loan until the end of the 2018–19 season. Al-Rubaie made his professional debut for Al-Batin in the Saudi Professional League on 19 October 2018, coming on as a substitute in the 72nd minute for Adriano Facchini in the 0–2 home loss against Al-Nassr. He went on to make six more appearances in all competitions.

On 28 January 2020, Al-Rubaie renewed his contract with Al-Ahli for another four seasons. He made his debut for Al-Ahli on 4 September 2020, coming on as a substitute in the 11th minute for Yasser Al-Mosailem in the 2–1 away loss against Abha. On 22 October 2020, Al-Rubaie made his first start for Al-Ahli and kept a clean sheet in the 1–0 win against Al-Wehda. On 21 January 2021, Al-Rubaie was injured in the league match against Abha and was replaced by Yasser Al-Mosailem. Al-Rubaie started the last four games of the 2020–21 season following an injury to first-choice goalkeeper Mohammed Al-Owais.

International career
Al-Rubaie was included in Saudi Arabia's squad for the 2019 AFC Asian Cup in the United Arab Emirates.

On 20 November 2019, Al-Rubaie was named in the squad for the 24th Arabian Gulf Cup.

On 6 July 2021, Al-Rubaie was named in the squad for the 2020 Olympics.

On 18 November 2021, Al-Rubaie was named in the squad for the 2021 FIFA Arab Cup.

On 11 November 2022, Al-Rubaie was named in the squad for the 2022 FIFA World Cup.

Career statistics

Club

References

External links
 
 
 

1997 births
Living people
People from Najran
Saudi Arabian footballers
Association football goalkeepers
Al-Okhdood Club players
Al-Ahli Saudi FC players
Al Batin FC players
Saudi Professional League players
Saudi First Division League players
Saudi Arabia youth international footballers
Olympic footballers of Saudi Arabia
Saudi Arabia international footballers
2019 AFC Asian Cup players
Footballers at the 2020 Summer Olympics
2022 FIFA World Cup players